Fabien Matras (born 12 September 1984) is a French politician, who was a member of the French National Assembly representing Var.

Biography

Early life
Born into a family of Italian immigrants, he was born in Grenoble on 12 September 1984. Matras completed his law studies from the 1st year Bachelor's degree of the 1st year Master's degree at the Draguignan branch of the Faculty of Law. In June 2012, he obtained the Research Master's degree "Comparative Law of Fundamental Freedoms". Professionally, he is a teacher at the Faculty of Law of Toulon, mainly in Draguignan in Public Law.

Political career
In 2014, he is elected Mayor of Flayosc.

Member of the National Assembly
He was elected to the French National Assembly on 18 June 2017, representing the representing the 8th constituency of Var.

In the National Assembly, he sits on the Constitutional Acts, Legislation and General Administration Committee. 
He is a President of the Information mission on the ethics of public servants and the management of conflicts of interest.

See also
 2017 French legislative election

References

1984 births
Living people
Deputies of the 15th National Assembly of the French Fifth Republic
La République En Marche! politicians
Place of birth missing (living people)